Harry Morrey Salmon CBE MC DL (1892 – May 1985) was a naturalist famed for his work in Wales and for his bird photography.

Career
He started his career as a photographer in 1909, joined the Cardiff Naturalists Society in 1910, and had become a published author by 1914. He was hailed as the "Welsh ornithologist of the century" and as "the father of British bird photography." His photographic career started in 1908.  He was the first to record the nocturnal activities of Manx Shearwater on the Pembrokeshire Islands and in 1924 he achieved another first by using his skill with a camera in choppy seas to obtain a census of the large colonies of Gannet on Grassholm. These memorable early photographs were used as illustrations in Birds in Britain Today which he and Geoffrey Ingram published in 1934. He was also a notable conservationist and in 1961 was responsible for the first proposal that the island of Flat Holm in the Bristol Channel should become a nature reserve, and in 1975 it was so designated. He was a key figure in the conservation of the Red Kite in Wales

He had a distinguished military career in the British army rising to the rank of captain in World War I and to that of colonel in World War II. He received the Military Cross and bar and was appointed a Commander of the Order of the British Empire (CBE) in recognition of his distinguished contribution to operations in the Mediterranean from November 1942 until May 1945.

He served as the treasurer of the National Museum of Wales from 1962 until 1982.

References

Welsh photographers
Welsh naturalists
1892 births
1985 deaths
20th-century British zoologists
20th-century naturalists
British ornithologists
British Army officers
British Army personnel of World War I
British Army personnel of World War II